Cape Froward is the southernmost point of mainland South America. It is located in the Magallanes Region of Chile, along the north shore of Magellan Strait, being the southern tip of the Brunswick Peninsula. In January 1587, the English corsair Thomas Cavendish named the place after the region's rough climate (strong rains and winds).

A large metallic cross (Cruz de los Mares, Cross of the Seas) was built on the cape's hill in honor of Pope John Paul II's visit to Chile in 1987. It is the latest cross located on the site, the first of which was built in 1913 and replaced several times since then due to the harsh weather.

See also
 Cape Horn
 False Cape Horn
 Froward Point
 XII Región de Magallanes

Notes

Froward
Landforms of Magallanes Region
Extreme points of Earth
Strait of Magellan
Brunswick Peninsula
Cliffs of Chile